Swithin Maxwell Arko (1920-2006) was a Ghanaian politician in the first republic. He was the member of parliament for the Agona Nsaba constituency from 1965 to 1966. Prior to entering parliament he was the chairman of the Agona Local Council and later chairman of the National Association of Local Government Councils.

Early life and education
Arko was born on 21 March 1920 at Nsaba, a town in the Central Region of Ghana. He was educated at the Nsaba Presbyterian Middle Boarding School and Mfantsipim School, Cape Coast. He proceeded to the United Kingdom to study Local Government Administration after working with U. A. G. Ltd for about ten years.

Career and politics
Arko begun working with U. A. G. Ltd from 1941 until 1951 when he left for the United Kingdom for further studies. Upon his return to Ghana in 1952, he served on the Agona Local Council as clerk of the council. In 1957 he joined the Cocoa Marketing Board as a senior loans officer. He worked with the Cocoa Marketing Board until 1962 when he became chairman of the Agona Local Council and vice chairman of the National Association of the Local Government Council. He later became chairman of the National Association of the Local Government Council. He was also an executive member of the African Union of Local Authorities and an executive member of the International Union of Local Authorities. In June 1965 he became the member of parliament for the Agona Nsaba constituency. He served in that capacity until February 1966 when the Nkrumah government was overthrown.

Personal life
Arko died in 2006 and was survived by seven children. His hobbies included reading and football.

See also
 List of MPs elected in the 1965 Ghanaian parliamentary election

References

1920 births
2006 deaths
Ghanaian MPs 1965–1966
Convention People's Party (Ghana) politicians
20th-century Ghanaian politicians
Mfantsipim School alumni
Ghanaian expatriates in the United Kingdom